An outdoor bronze sculpture of Horace Greeley by artist John Quincy Adams Ward and architect Richard Morris Hunt is located in City Hall Park in Manhattan, New York. Cast in 1890, the seated statue is set on a Quincy granite pedestal.

History
The statue was dedicated outside the New York Tribune Building, just east of City Hall Park, on September 20, 1890. The statue was ordered to be moved in 1915 because it projected from Tribune Building's lot line, and because the building's ground-floor space behind the statue had been leased. The statue was moved to City Hall Park on June 19, 1916.

See also 

 Tributes to Horace Greeley

References

External links 

 City Hall Park. Horace Greeley statue. at NYPL Digital Collections

1890 sculptures
Bronze sculptures in Manhattan
Horace Greeley
Monuments and memorials in Manhattan
Outdoor sculptures in Manhattan
Sculptures of men in New York City
Statues in New York City
Greeley